The Triangle Land is a 2012 Chinese romantic comedy film directed by Chen Kunhou and written by Chen Ching-Hui and Cao Wenxuan. The film stars Yang Chengcheng, Hsieh Dong-Yu, Zhu Zhi-Ying, Honduras, Cindy Mong, Chiu Yen-Hsiang, and Ken Lin. The film is an adaptation of Cao Wenxuan's novel of the same name. The Triangle Land was released in mainland China on November 9, 2012, and in Taiwan on January 4, 2013.

Plot
The film is about the life of a family of seven. Ah Nan is a senior university student, he loves his classmate Dan Niu, a beautiful girl who comes back from Canada. When Dan Niu knowns Ah Nan's parents are drunkard and gambler and his brothers are thief and blockhead, they break up. After losing his love, Ah Nan drops out. Phoebe, a friend of Ah Nan, her parents died of a plane crash, but she doesn't give up her hope for life. Ah Nan is influenced by Phoebe and determines to live hard and changes the situation. The whole family is influenced by his spirit, they open a boarding house.

Cast
 Yang Chengcheng as Dan Niu
 Hsieh Dong-Yu as Ah Nan
 Zhu Zhi-Ying as Phoebe
 Honduras as Chen's father
 Cindy Mong as Chen's mother
 Chiu Yen-Hsiang as Ceramist
 Ken Lin as Ah Kai
 Qiu Ruiyong as Da Fei
 Lin Yongxu as Xiao Kang
 Wu Yaruo as Tongtong

Production
Most of the film was shot on location in Miaoli County.

Release
The film premiered at the Capital Cinema on November 7, 2012, in Beijing. The film was released on November 9, 2012, in mainland China, and on January 4, in Taiwan.

Accolades

References

External links

2012 films
Taiwanese romantic comedy films
Chinese romantic comedy films
Films shot in Taiwan
Films based on Chinese novels